Southport is a census-designated place (CDP) in the town of Fairfield, Connecticut. It is located along Long Island Sound between Mill River and Sasco Brook, where it borders Westport. As of the 2020 census, it had a population of 1,710. Settled in 1639, Southport center has been designated a local historic district since 1967. In 1971, it was listed on the National Register of Historic Places as the Southport Historic District.

History 

The indigenous village of Sasqua, inhabited by Quiripi language speakers, was located in the area. Members of that community later formed the Golden Hill Paugussett Indian Nation.

The earliest recorded event in Southport's history was "The Great Swamp Fight" or "Fairfield Swamp Fight" of July 1637 (not to be confused with the later Great Swamp Fight of King Philip's War), an episode of the Pequot War in which English colonial forces led by John Mason and Roger Ludlow vanquished a band of 80 to 100 Pequot Indians who had earlier fled from their home territory in the Mystic area and taken refuge with approximately 200 Sasqua Indians who inhabited the area that is now Fairfield. The exact location of the battle is unclear, but it is known to have been in the vicinity of Southport. In 1639, Ludlow established the town of Fairfield on the Pequot land known as Unquowa. Colonial deeds of land were signed with the Sasqua in the 1670s.

In the eighteenth century, Mill River village, a part of Fairfield, was a small hamlet of a few houses and a wharf at the mouth of Fairfield's Mill River. Farm products from the surrounding area were shipped from Mill River's small harbor to ports in New York and beyond.

By 1831 the village had changed its name to Southport and was a bustling commercial area with warehouses, churches, schools, stores and elegant houses. Before 1853, Southport had its own local government as a borough within the town of Fairfield.

Economic history 
Southport became a leading coastal port on Long Island Sound, its ships carrying produce and goods back and forth to New York City. A measure of Southport's success is the fact that throughout the 1800s it possessed the only two banks in town. However, competition from steamboats and the railroad took its toll on prosperity. Resourceful shippers teamed with local farmers and businessmen to keep the port going.

The Southport Onion, a high quality onion, was developed and grown on Westport's and Fairfield's hills and shipped in Southport market boats. These boats were mostly sloops that carried 50 tons and more in some cases of cargo  keeping the harbor profitable until the end of the century. The federal government supported repairs to the harbor in the 1840s. During the 1840s the greatest agricultural innovation in Fairfield became the cultivation of onions. From 1840 to 1890, 200,000 tons yearly were shipped out of Southport. Designed to be easily stored, during The Civil War sales spiked, its high vitamin C content prized by the U.S. Navy to prevent scurvy. The U.S. Army prized it to treat gunshot wounds, at one point to the extent that General Ulysses S. Grant refused to move his troops if they were not supplied with onions.

In the 1890s, 100,000 barrels of locally grown onions, carrots, potatoes, and other goods were shipped annually from Southport harbor. 

The shipping industry was the economic foundation of the village of Mill River. The village, as it became a large port, eventually changed its name to South Port, later Southport. Local farmers transported their Southport Globe onions and other crops via the growing shipping fleet housed in the harbor and, by 1836, it became larger than the New York City and Boston ports. The ships sailed to destinations as far as the West Indies, but often went to New York City, where larger vessels in a deeper port headed to more distant foreign destinations. During the 150 years between 1750 and 1900, the shipping industry grew dramatically, but died out as the railroad industry and steamship industries took over. The increased use of large shipping containers also decreased transport costs and eventually drove the need to use ports deeper than Southport Harbor. The local produce was transported to New York and Boston via train, to deeper water ports where larger vessels were docked.

Local Sea Captains 

During the peak of the shipping era, Southport had four shipyards in old Mill River, and many of Southport's first families built their wealth in the lucrative shipping trade that grew in response to local farmers wanting a more convenient port than Bridgeport and Norwalk Harbors. Numerous area parks and streets are named after prominent sea captains, including Bulkley Avenue, Sherwood Island State Park, and Sturges Highway. Capt. Zalman Wakeman owned Wakeman Farms, which is still operating today.

Preservation 

Today, much of the old village area is part of a town historic district, first established in 1967, where buildings from three centuries are protected for future generations. The boundaries of the town historic district are the railroad on the north; the Mill River and Southport Harbor on the south; Church Street; and Old South Road and Rose Hill Road on the west and east, respectively, including all properties on both sides of the roads. Strict historic zoning regulations apply in the district and have been upheld by the Connecticut Supreme Court. The Southport Historic District is also listed on the National Register of Historic Places.

Geography

Demographics

The village of Southport corresponds to census tract 606. As of the census of 2020, there were 1,710 people in the village, organized into 798 households. The racial makeup of the town was 87% White, 5% Hispanic or Latino of any race, 4%  African American, 2% Asian, 0% Native American, and 2% identifying as two or more races. .

Households averaged 2.1 persons, with 66% consisting of married couples, 7.3% of female householders with no husband present, 2.5% of male householders, and 24.4% of people who were not family members. 16% of residents were under the age of 18, 60.1% were between the ages of 18 and 64, and 23.9% were over the age of 65.

The median household income was $180,057, with 9% of households below the poverty line. The median value of homes in the village was $766,900

Public services

Southport has had its own firefighting service since 1895. The Southport Fire Department was organized that year as a volunteer fire department after a large arson fire in the village. However, it is also protected by Fairfield Fire Department's Engine 4, out of the Southport Firehouse.

The neighborhood's ZIP Code is 06890, whose scope extends further north from the historic village area to include the Mill Hill area.

Library 

The community's public library is the Pequot Library, founded Virginia Marquand Monroe and Elbert Monroe in 1887.  A Richardsonian Romanesque building, it was designed by the architect Robert Henderson Robertson and is a contributing property to the National Register Southport Historic District.

The library has a large collection of manuscripts, rare books, and archives. Of the approximate 30,000 items in the Special Collections,1800 items are held on long-term loan at the Beinecke Rare Book and Manuscript Library at Yale University. The collection includes the first printed cookbook, De Honesta Voluptate et Valetudine,by Bartholomaeus Platina (1475); autographs of all American Presidents and the cosigners of th Declaration of Independence, including the rare Button Gwinnett autograph. Among the titles in the Special Collections are Epistola de insulis nuper inventis by Christopher Columbus, translated into Latin by Leandro di Cosco and printed in 1493; two of the three contemporaneous histories of the Pequot War in New England; the Saybrook Platform which was the first book published in Connecticut in 1710. Also included in the collection is Phillis Wheatley's Poems on various subjects, religious and moral from 1786 as well as the typescript of the last four chapters of Margaret Mitchell's Gone With the Wind.

The library's annual summer book sale featured more than 140,000 volumes on sale in 2007. In 2006, the Pequot Library invested in a restoration project to address the condition of the elaborate metalwork set throughout their stacks. Robert Robertson designed each shelf in the library to be supported by cast iron structures. Each row of shelving is framed by columns and the stairways linking the two storeys are made with balusters of garlands and vines in copper plated cast iron. During the course of restoration, over 6,000 metal pieces were individually treated. The project was carried out by Newmans’ Ltd.

Education

Eagle Hill School-Southport, a private day school for children with learning disabilities, has been located since 1985 in the former Pequot School in Southport. The historic school building was earlier acquired by the Southport Conservancy to save it from demolition.

Southport is served by the Fairfield Public Schools. Southport is home to Mill Hill Elementary School, although children in some areas considered part of the Southport neighborhood but outside the census tract attend Timothy Dwight Elementary School. Both Mill Hill and Dwight Schools feed into Roger Ludlowe Middle School, Tomlinson Middle School and Fairfield Ludlowe High School.

Transportation
The main arterial road in the area, the Post Road (US Route 1), runs through Southport, connecting it to other towns along the Connecticut coast. Interstate 95 also passes through Southport, with two exits located in the neighborhood. Southport is also served by the New Haven Line of the Metro-North Commuter Railroad at Southport Railroad Station, with frequent trains to New Haven and New York City. Limited bus service is provided by the Greater Bridgeport Transit Authority.

Notable people 

The following are among the notable people who have lived in Southport:
 James Truslow Adams, historian and writer
 John Akers, former chief executive officer of IBM
 Anatole Broyard, author
 Ina Garten, celebrity cook and author
 Jeffrey Garten, economic adviser and author
 Don Imus, radio personality
 Richard Clarida, Vice Chairman of the Federal Reserve, Economist 
 Kenton Clarke, CEO, Computer Consulting Associates International Inc.
 Ruth Madoff, widow of Bernie Madoff
 Samuel J. Palmisano, former chief executive officer of IBM
 Jason Robards, actor, producer and director
 Thomas Lambard Robinson, newspaper publisher
 Ira Dever Warner, inventor, founder of Warner Corset Company
 Jack Welch, former CEO General Electric

Movies filmed in Southport 
 Revolutionary Road (2007)
 And So It Goes (2014)

References

External links

 The Southport Conservancy (organization for preservation and restoration of historic properties in Southport)
 The Southport Globe (a website focused on the community)
 The Southport Picture File  (a collection of 800 historical photos compiled by historian V. Louise Higgins.  Housed at Pequot Library and accessible online.)
 Living in Southport, Conn. (New York Times photo collection)
 Brilvitch, Charles. 1977. Walking Through History. The Seaports of Black Rock and Southport. Fairfield Historical Society.

Fairfield, Connecticut
Neighborhoods in Connecticut
Populated coastal places in Connecticut
Census-designated places in Fairfield County, Connecticut
Census-designated places in Connecticut